Milena Ercolani (born 19 September 1963) is a Sammarinese poet and novelist.  An alumna of the Antica Università Picena, she is a teacher. Ercolani is active in the literary life of her country, and has represented San Marino at numerous literary events around the world.

Ercolani has written since childhood, and has also produced stories for children. Her work has won numerous prizes. She is the president of the Sammarina Cultural Association, which promotes the artistic work of San Marino and the surrounding region.

Works
Ercolani's works include:
Fuggendo dal Regno di Niente (poetry) (1993)
Mareggiate (poetry) (1995)
Donna in mare (poetry) (1996)
Il canto della crisalide (poetry) (2005)
Celesta (novel) (2007)
Figlie della luna (novel) (2009)
Angiolino e Maria (novel) (2010)
Quando ti scrivevo Amore (poesie ) (2010)

Antologia Poetica (poetry) (2011)
Coccole di zucchero filato (poetry) (2015)
Androceo – Storia di Virus e di Stelle (novel) (2020)

References

1963 births
Living people
Sammarinese women writers
Sammarinese poets
Sammarinese novelists
Sammarinese women poets
Women novelists
Sammarinese educators
20th-century poets
20th-century women writers
21st-century poets
21st-century women writers
Women educators